Fidan Doğan, Sakine Cansiz and Leyla Şaylemez, Kurdish women's activists, were murdered by gunshots to the head during the night of 9–10 January 2013 in the 10th arrondissement of Paris.

Facts 
During the night between Wednesday 9 and Thursday 10 January 2013, the bodies of Fidan Doğan (28), Sakine Cansız (54), co-founder of the Kurdistan Workers' Party (PKK) and Leyla Şaylemez (24) – all three Kurdish women activists – were found in the premises of the Centre d'Information sur le Kurdistan located on 147 Rue La Fayette in Paris. Each of them were shot execution-style with several bullets in the head and neck.

Investigations 
According to investigations by French authorities, it is possible that Turkey's National Intelligence Organization (MİT) is involved in the murders. The suspected murderer, Ömer Güney, was a 34 year old Turkish maintenance employee at Paris Charles de Gaulle airport. Video cameras at the site of the murder show that he was inside the building between 00:11 and 00:56 when the deaths occurred. Gunpowder was found on his bag. Technical investigations were performed on his Nokia mobile phone and experts decrypted it and restored deleted files. They found images taken the day before (8 January) establishing that he was in the premises of a Kurdish association in Villers-le-Bel between 4:23 and 5:33 in the morning and took pictures of 329 memberships files. Two days before, he took pictures of accounting tracing alleged racketeering activity inside the Kurdish community. While Güney initially presented himself to authorities as "Kurdish at heart" and sympathetic to the PKK, his relatives described him as a Turkish ultranationalist who defined himself as a "gray wolf", a Turkish neo-fascist organization which positions itself against Kurdish political projects.

A few months after these murders, an audio recording between Ömer Güney and suspected MİT agents was released on the Internet. Omer Güney also had hundreds of pictures of Kurdish activists in his mobile phone. Anti-terrorist judge Jeanne Duyé was in charge of investigations; in September 2013, her computer was stolen from her home in a burglary. Ömer Güney was detained on the 21 January 2013. The French anti-terrorism unit Sous-direction anti-terroriste[fr] found a passport with three stamps from journeys to Turkey behind the radio in a car he borrowed the day of the murder.

The prosecution stated Güney had frequent contacts with Turkish secret services and was proven to be involved in espionage. The judge considered the involvement of Turkish secret services in the murder to be a possibility, but didn't establish who ordered the operation and if the murderer acted according to the will of the top management or not (in theory, this may have been an attempt to stall peace talks that were occurring between Ankara and the PKK at that time). On 13 December 2016, Ömer Güney was moved to a hospital for urgent care connected to his brain tumor and he died the next day, five weeks before the scheduled start of his trial.

Shortly after Güney died, France decided to close the investigation into the murders. In May 2019 the investigation was reopened.

Eyyup Doru, a representative of the Peoples' Democratic Party (HDP) speculated that the primary target of the triple assassination might have been Fidan Doğan because of her social and political connections in France. Lawyer Sylvie Boitel explained that this young woman was very clever and had three cultures: French, Turkish and Kurdish. One of brothers said that she met French President François Hollande several times when he was leader of the Socialist Party, and had active relationships with French authorities.

Metin, the brother of Sakine Cansiz, claimed that France was responsible because she was killed in France and the murderer died in jail before trial, going on to point out that since the slaying neither the President nor Prime Minister of France has contacted the families of the victims.

Aftermath 
On 17 January in Diyarbakir, Turkey tens of thousands of Kurds remembered the three women in a ceremony.

Funerals 
Each woman was buried in her hometown: Cansız in Tunceli, Doğan in Kahramanmaraş, and Söylemez in Mersin.

Thousands took to the streets in Diyarbakır to pay their respects. The crowds chanted “The martyrs’ path is our path,” as the coffins were carried.

Fidan Doğan was buried in her family's village in the Elbistan district of Kahramanmaraş province, Turkey. The funeral, conducted by an Alevi dede, was attended by around 5,000 people, her coffin wrapped in the flag of the PKK whilst mourners wore white scarves to symbolise peace. The mourners included Peace and Democracy Party co-chair Gülten Kışanak, and deputies Nursel Aydoğan, Ayla Akat Ata, Hasip Kaplan as well as the mayor of Diyarbakır Osman Baydemir. Speaking at the Funeral Kışanak is quoted as saying; "We promise to all Kurdish women and these three women: We will bring peace and freedom to this land,”.

Protests 
On the third anniversary of the assassinations thousands in Paris attended to protest among other reasons for justice and to denounce “crimes by the Turkish regime”. Carrying the flag of the PKK and portraits of Abdullah Öcalan the marched lead to the scene of the killing, where flowers were laid in memory of the victims. Sakine Cansiz's brother Haydar who travelled from Germany for the march told the press: “Sakine's fight goes on. We will continue to march until we have obtained justice.”

See also 
List of assassinations of the Kurdish–Turkish conflict

Further reading
 Triple Assassinat au 147, Rue Lafayette (en:Triple assassination at 147, rue Lafayette) by Laure Marchand. (Published by Actes Sud) [] - An investigation into the murders and links with the Turkish secret services. It outlines the biographies of the three women and discusses the politics of Recep Tayyip Erdoğan.

References 

2013 in Paris
2013 murders in France
10th arrondissement of Paris
Deaths by firearm in France
January 2013 crimes in Europe
January 2013 events in France
Murder in Paris
Violence against women in France
History of the Kurdistan Workers' Party
2010s murders in Paris